Buena Nueva Cove is a small open cove, 900 m wide and indenting for 200 m the northwest coast of False Bay, Livingston Island in the South Shetland Islands, Antarctica southeast of MacGregor Peaks and east of Castro Peak on Hurd Peninsula.  The area was visited by early 19th century sealers.

The feature is named after the ship Buena Nueva in which the Spanish navigator Gabriel de Castilla made his voyage south of Drake Passage in 1603.

Location

Maps
 Isla Livingston: Península Hurd. Mapa topográfico de escala 1:25000. Madrid: Servicio Geográfico del Ejército, 1991. (Map reproduced on p. 16 of the linked work)
 L.L. Ivanov et al. Antarctica: Livingston Island and Greenwich Island, South Shetland Islands. Scale 1:100000 topographic map. Sofia: Antarctic Place-names Commission of Bulgaria, 2005.
 L.L. Ivanov. Antarctica: Livingston Island and Greenwich, Robert, Snow and Smith Islands. Scale 1:120000 topographic map.  Troyan: Manfred Wörner Foundation, 2009.  
 Antarctic Digital Database (ADD). Scale 1:250000 topographic map of Antarctica. Scientific Committee on Antarctic Research (SCAR). Since 1993, regularly upgraded and updated.
 L.L. Ivanov. Antarctica: Livingston Island and Smith Island. Scale 1:100000 topographic map. Manfred Wörner Foundation, 2017.

References
 SCAR Composite Antarctic Gazetteer.

Coves of Livingston Island